Arnèke is a commune in the Nord department in northern France.

Geography
Arnèke is situated on the D55 (route de Wormhout). The small river Peene Becque is flowing through the village. The village eastern limit with Ledringhem is voie romaine (D52) and southern limit is Peene Becque.

Population

Heraldry

Transportation

A train station is serving the village.

See also
Communes of the Nord department

References

Communes of Nord (French department)
French Flanders